The tapered cavesnail, scientific name Fontigens holsingeri, is a species of very small freshwater snail with a gill and an operculum, an aquatic gastropod mollusk in the family Hydrobiidae. This species is endemic to the United States.

References

Molluscs of the United States
Fontigens
Hydrobiidae
Cave snails
Gastropods described in 1976
Taxonomy articles created by Polbot